The Traitors may refer to:

 The Traitors (1962 film), a British film
 The Traitors (1972 film), an Argentinian film
 De Verraders, a Dutch reality TV series, translated as The Traitors in English-language adaptations
 The Traitors (American TV series), an American adaptation of the show
 The Traitors (Australian TV series), an Australian adaptation of the show
 The Traitors (British TV series), a British adaptation of the show
 "The Traitors", fourth episode of the 1965 Doctor Who serial The Daleks' Master Plan

See also
 Traiteur (disambiguation)
 Traitor (disambiguation)